Illinois Route 34 (IL 34) is a north–south state road in southern Illinois. It runs from a former ferry crossing to Kentucky Route 297 across the Ohio River in Rosiclare to Illinois Routes 14/37 in Benton.

Route description 
Illinois 34 overlaps Illinois Route 146 and Illinois Route 145 between Rosiclare and Harrisburg. In Harrisburg, Illinois 34 formerly ran the length of Main Street where it at one time sharply turned at Raymond St, then crossed a five way stop between U.S. Route 45, Sloan St, and Illinois Route 145 where it overlapped.

Congestion in this area was greatly reduced when the concurrent highway was re-routed farther south to connect and is now concurrent with U.S. Route 45, which it follows to the Bill Franks Bypass (Illinois Route 13). Route 34 then travels west with Route 13 to Main Street, where it then departs Harrisburg heading north.

Illinois Route 34 serves as a main north–south road for towns located in the eastern portion of the Shawnee National Forest.

History 
SBI Route 37 ran from Harrisburg to Elizabethtown, currently located northeast of Rosiclare on Illinois 146. There was also a spur west to Golconda, which is located southwest of Rosiclare on modern-day Illinois 146. In 1937, the road was extended northwest to Benton and its southern end moved to the Rosiclare ferry,  which stopped operating in the mid 1960s.

Major intersections

References

External links 

Illinois Highway Ends: Illinois Route 34

034
Transportation in Saline County, Illinois
Transportation in Franklin County, Illinois
Transportation in Hardin County, Illinois
Transportation in Pope County, Illinois